Khomeh Sofla (also Romanized as Khomeh Soflá; also known as Khvomeh-ye Pā’īn and Khomeh-ye Pā’īn) is a village in Khomeh Rural District, in the Central District of Aligudarz County, Lorestan Province, Iran. At the 2006 census, its population was 860, in 188 families, making it the most populous village in the rural district.

References 

Towns and villages in Aligudarz County